Marcus Ziegler (born 10 August 1973) is a German former professional footballer who played as a forward.

He was capped once for Germany under-21 national team, in 1994. He was on the books of VfB Stuttgart from 1992 to 1996, appearing in eight Bundesliga matches. In the spring of 1996 he was loaned out to Strømsgodset IF in the Norwegian Eliteserien where he did not make an appearance. Failing to make an impact, he moved on to SSV Ulm 1846 in 1997. In 2000 he played for VfR Mannheim in the Regionalliga.

References

External links
 

1973 births
Living people
German footballers
Association football forwards
Germany under-21 international footballers
Bundesliga players
Eliteserien players
VfB Stuttgart players
Strømsgodset Toppfotball players
SSV Ulm 1846 players
VfR Mannheim players
German expatriate footballers
German expatriate sportspeople in Norway
Expatriate footballers in Norway